Endless runner or infinite runner is a subgenre of platform game in which the player character runs for an infinite amount of time while avoiding obstacles. The player's objective is to reach a high score by surviving for as long as possible. The method by which the game level or environment appears to continuously spawn before the player is an example of procedural generation. The genre exploded on mobile platforms following the success of Temple Run, with Jetpack Joyride and Canabalt being other popular examples. Its popularity is attributed to its simple gameplay that works well on touchscreen devices.

Concepts 
Endless runners can be side-scrolling, as in the genre's early titles, top-down, or 3D, but the player is placed in a neverending level in which the character automatically moves forward. The player's only form of control is to have the character dodge obstacles, either by moving out of the way or using a specific button. Some form of points, currency, or other rewards are gained over time by maneuvering in the level or simply staying alive longer. The game progressively increases in difficulty as time goes on. The player has a game over if they are hindered enough by the obstacles that they are "caught" by whatever is chasing them and die.

History 
Older games, such as the 1983 B.C.'s Quest for Tires, featured similar designs to modern endless runner titles. However, while B.C.'s Quest was considered a commercial hit for its time, its design was not copied. The endless runner as a subgenre was only created following the release of Canabalt, a 2009 indie game developed by Adam Saltsman in which a businessman flees from a city being destroyed by giant robots. It allows the character to leap and dodge obstacles when the screen is tapped, overcoming a design limitation caused by the simplicity of smartphone touchscreens. Adult Swim Games soon asked Saltsman for permission to adapt Canabalt's design into their own title, and released Robot Unicorn Attack in 2010. It became an internet meme due to Adult Swim's larger audience and its quirky themes. After only a few months, the App Store was full of endless runner clones such as Temple Run.

The genre was built upon with new ideas in the ensuing games, with Jetpack Joyride including vehicles and Temple Run introducing a 3D over-the-shoulder viewpoint. The Bit.Trip series added rhythm game elements. As time went on, numerous large franchises adapted their gameplay into endless runner mobile spin-offs, including the 2013 Sonic Dash and the 2015 Lara Croft: Relic Run.

References 

 
Video game genres